Ryan Flinn may refer to:

 Ryan Flinn (American football) (born 1980), former American football punter
 Ryan Flinn (ice hockey) (born 1980), Canadian ice hockey winger